The 1931 Yale Bulldogs football team represented Yale University in the 1931 college football season. In their fourth year under head coach Mal Stevens, Yale compiled a 5–1–2 record, shut out four opponents, and outscored all opponents, 198 to 79. In the annual rivalry game, Yale defeated Princeton by a 51–14 score, the worst defeat in Princeton history.

Two Yale players received All-America recognition. Halfback and team captain Albie Booth was selected on the second team by the International News Service (INS) and on the third team by the Associated Press.  End Herster Barnes was selected on the third team by the INS.

Joe Crowley set a Yale Bowl record by scoring five touchdowns in a single game on November 7, 1931.

Schedule

References

Yale
Yale Bulldogs football seasons
Yale Bulldogs football